Hugh Crawford Smith (1846–1907) was an English businessman and Liberal Unionist MP for Tyneside from 1900 to 1906.

His wife was Hannah Ralston Lockhart, and his son was Norman Lockhart Smith.

References

Additional sources
Craig, F.W.S. British Parliamentary Election Results 1885-1918
Whitaker's Almanack, 1901 to 1906 editions

External links
 portraits of Hugh Crawford Smith at npg.org.uk

Liberal Unionist Party MPs for English constituencies
UK MPs 1900–1906
Politics of Tyne and Wear
1846 births
1907 deaths